The Council Grove Group is a geologic group in Kansas, Oklahoma, and Nebraska as well as subsurface Colorado. It preserves fossils dating to the Carboniferous-Permian boundary. This group forms the foundations and lower ranges of the Flint Hills of Kansas, underlying the Chase Group that forms the highest ridges of the Flint Hills.

The Group particularly consists of megaclycothems alternating between massive mudstone paleosols and massive shallow marine limestone. The sequences of these alternations correlate with the ~400,000 year component of Milankovitch cycles. A number of the limestones have minor flint-filled marine animal burrows, anticipating the massive flint beds of the Chase Group.

With the exposure of the group's lower formations in the 1993 flooding, the entirety of the Council Grove Group, from hillcrest Speiser Shale down to pond-level Americus limestone, is exposed for study from top to bottom in the Tuttle Creek Lake Spillway.

See also

 List of fossiliferous stratigraphic units in Kansas
 List of fossiliferous stratigraphic units in Nebraska
 List of fossiliferous stratigraphic units in Oklahoma
 Paleontology in Kansas
 Paleontology in Nebraska
 Paleontology in Oklahoma

References

Further reading
 
 This report encyclopedically covers the units exposed in the Tuttle Creek Lake Project area, predominantly the lower Permian.

Permian Colorado
Permian Kansas
Permian geology of Nebraska
Permian geology of Oklahoma
Carboniferous southern paleotropical deposits